USS PGM-17 was a  built for the United States Navy during World War II. She ran aground near Okinawa in May 1945. She was salvaged a month later, but was never repaired. She was towed to deep water and sunk in October 1945.

Career 
PC-1189 was laid down on 10 August 1943 and launched 14 April 1944. She was renamed and reclassified PGM-17, a PGM-9 gunboat on 16 August 1944.  She was commissioned as USS PGM-17 on 24 November 1944 and assigned to the Pacific theater.  USS PGM-17 participated in the assault and occupation of Okinawa between 25 March and 4 May 1945 before striking a reef.  She was salvaged and towed to Zamami Shima, Kerama Retta and beached at Agana Ura.  She was decommissioned on 2 June 1945.  USS PGM-17 was disposed of by sinking off the coast of Kerama Retta in October 1945.

Service 
After her commission, PGM-17 was sent to the Pacific theater and was involved in the Battle of Okinawa.  During the first days of the battle, PGM-17 spotted and destroyed several Japanese mines with small arms fire.  On the first day of the ground invasion of Okinawa, on 1 April 1945, PGM-17 shot down a Japanese Aicha "Val" dive bomber.  PGM-17 spent the month of April and the beginning of May scouting and destroying mines, offering assistance to disabled and damaged ships, running supplies, and fending off kamikaze attacks.

On 4 May 1945, USS PGM-17 ran aground an uncharted coral reef off the coast of Kouri Jima.  A salvage tug arrived a few hours later and prepared to tow the ship.  At first, the hull had no damage, but as high waves caused PGM-17 to relentlessly bash into the reef, it became clear that salvaging the ship was unlikely.  On 5 May, the captain, Lieutenant Edwin L. Williams Jr. ordered all hands to abandon ship.  The salvage attempt was abandoned due to rough waters.  On 7 May 1945, salvage ship USS Deliver (AR-23) began salvaging PGM-17.  Deliver spent five days pumping water off PGM-17 and patching the hull.  However, Deliver was called off to assist USS Hugh W. Hadley (DD-774) which had been struck by three kamikaze aircraft.  It wasn't until two weeks later that LCI-738 began salvaging PGM-17 on 27 May 1945.  After almost two weeks of salvage work, PGM-17 was finally pulled off the reef on 9 June 1945, spending over a month stranded on the reef.  Despite heavy kamikaze attacks throughout the region, PMG-17 managed to go the entire time without taking enemy fire.

On 9 June 1945, USS PGM-17 was towed to the Agono Urn Cove on Zamami Shima where she was grounded on shallow water.  On 2 July, she was decommissioned and left until October 1945 when she was towed out to deep waters and sunk.

References 

 

PC-461-class submarine chasers
Ships built in Jacksonville, Florida
1944 ships
PGM-9-class motor gunboats
World War II patrol vessels of the United States
World War II gunboats of the United States
Maritime incidents in May 1945